Eighteen Chefs is a restaurant chain and franchise company in Singapore based on the principle of social enterprise. The restaurants serve mainly Western cuisine but local food is also found on the menu. As of September 2020, Eighteen Chefs has a total of eleven outlets in Singapore.

History
The first Eighteen Chefs outlet was opened in 2007, at Eastpoint Mall, by an ex-offender and former drug addict Benny Se Teo, who had difficulty finding a job.  

While on an internship with Jamie Oliver, he heard about the Fifteen Foundation. He started Eighteen Chefs along similar lines, and is now the director of the company in 2015.

Three of the outlets, located at Yishun, Tiong Bahru and Buona Vista were closed in 2009 because of financial losses.

Awards
 2009 Honoree – Spirit of Enterprise Award 
 2012 – Social Enterprise of the Year from President's Challenge
 2013 – Emerging Enterprise award from The Business Times and OCBC Bank
 2015 – RAS Epicurean Star Award 2015 for Best Chain (Western) Restaurant and overall Best of the Best Chain Restaurant
 2015 – SME One Asia Award

References

Restaurant chains in Singapore
Fast-food chains of Singapore
Social enterprises
Singaporean brands

External links
 Official website